Verrabotn is a village located in the municipality of Indre Fosen in Trøndelag county, Norway. It is located at end of the Verrasundet arm of the Trondheimsfjord. Norwegian National Road 720 runs through the village, which formerly had a primary school. The village is the location of Fines Church.

References

Villages in Trøndelag
Indre Fosen